Vargapupa is a genus of air-breathing land snails, terrestrial pulmonate gastropod mollusks in the family Pupinidae.

Species
 Vargapupa biheli Páll-Gergely, 2015
 Vargapupa humilis Páll-Gergely, 2016
 Vargapupa oharai Páll-Gergely, 2015
Taxon inquirendum:
 Vargapupa huberi Thach, 2018 (taxon inquirendum, debated synonym)

References

External links
/  Páll-Gergely B., Fehér Z., Hunyadi A. & Asami T. (2015). Revision of the genus Pseudopomatias and its relatives (Gastropoda: Cyclophoroidea: Pupinidae). Zootaxa. 3937(1): 1-49